Torre Hermosillo or Hermosillo Tower is the third tallest tower in the city of Hermosillo, Sonora, Mexico located exactly at Northeast Hermosillo. With  it rises above the Hotel zone in Hermosillo. It was completed in 1995 and has been an icon for Hermosillo. 

The tower is currently owned by Grupo Delphi.

References

Hermosillo
Buildings and structures in Sonora